Palmital may refer to the following places in Brazil:

 Palmital, Paraná
 Palmital, São Paulo

See also
 Palmital River (disambiguation)
 Palmitas, Soriano Department, Uruguay
 Palmita, a synonym of the moth genus Hypotia